Ruiner may refer to:

Video games 

Ruiner (video game), a 2017 shooter video game
Ruiner Pinball, a 1995 pinball video game

Music 

Ruiner (band), an American hardcore punk band
Ruiner (A Wilhelm Scream album), 2005
Ruiner (Nothing,Nowhere album), 2018
"Ruiner", a song by Nine Inch Nails from The Downward Spiral